The 1911 Canadian census was a detailed enumeration of the Canadian population. The census was started on June 1, 1911. All reports had been received by February 26, 1912. The total population count of Canada was 7,206,643. This was an increase of 34% over the 1901 census of 5,371,315.

The previous census was the Northwest Provinces of Alberta, Saskatchewan, and Manitoba 1906 census and the following census was the Northwest Provinces of Alberta, Saskatchewan, and Manitoba 1916 census.

Census summary
Information was collected on the following subjects, with a separate "schedule" or census data collection form associated with each subject:
 Population
 Mortality, Disability and Compensation
 Houses, Buildings and Fruit
 Agriculture: Field Crops - Grain and Other Field Crops for the Harvest Year 1910
 Agriculture: Hoed Crops, Tobacco, Hops and Grass Seeds in 1910 and Field Crop Areas in 1911
 Agriculture: Animal and Animal Products
 Farm and Urban Values
 Forest Products
 Manufactures
 Churches, Schools, etc.
 Fisheries
 Dairy Factories
 Mineral Products

The 1911 census was the last census to include questions about "infirmities". In 1911, 28,611 people were identified as "infirm":
 3,238 people as blind
 4,584 people as deaf and unable to speak ("deaf and dumb")
 14,702 people as insane ("crazy or lunatic")
 5,387 people as "idiotic" or "feeble-minded" ("idiotic or silly")
People who were deaf but able to speak were not classified as infirm.

Population by province

Methodology 
The census was conducted by the Canadian Ministry of Agriculture under the authority of the Census and Statistics Act of 1905. 9,703 enumerators visited homes across the country, asked the required questions and recorded the responses from each household onto paper forms. For the census, each province or territory was subdivided into districts, usually based on electoral districts, cities or counties, which were in turn divided into sub-districts, which were towns, townships, city wards or parishes. One handwritten line in English or French was entered for each person enumerated. The responses were collected, tabulated and summary statistics were produced. In 1955, the paper records of responses were microfilmed and the original paper forms were destroyed. The microfilm has since been scanned and converted into a series of images which are now available online at the Library and Archives Canada web site.

See also

Population of Canada by year
Demographics of Canada
Ethnic groups in Canada
History of immigration to Canada

References

External links
Census of Canada, 1911
Historical Statistics of Canada
Name index for the 1911 Census

Census
Censuses in Canada
Canada